Roman Bolbocian (born 13 May 1987) is a Moldovan/Greek footballer who currently plays for Digenis Oroklinis as a midfielder.

Born in Moldova, in 2005, he received a Greek passport.

Career
Bolbocian was born in Moldova, but moved to Greece when was 10. He began his career with a Greek club Skoda Xanthi. In Greece he also played for Asteras Tripoli and Ilioupoli, before moving to Bulgaria in February 2010, signing a contract with Lokomotiv Plovdiv.

References

External links

1987 births
Living people
Moldovan footballers
Moldovan expatriate footballers
Asteras Tripolis F.C. players
Ilioupoli F.C. players
Xanthi F.C. players
Fokikos A.C. players
PFC Lokomotiv Plovdiv players
Digenis Akritas Morphou FC players
Chalkanoras Idaliou players
ASIL Lysi players
Digenis Oroklinis players
Football League (Greece) players
Cypriot Second Division players
Expatriate footballers in Greece
Expatriate footballers in Bulgaria
Expatriate footballers in Cyprus
Association football midfielders